A vaccination schedule is a series of vaccinations, including the timing of all doses, which may be either recommended or compulsory, depending on the country of residence.
A vaccine is an antigenic preparation used to produce active immunity to a disease, in order to prevent or reduce the effects of infection by any natural or "wild" pathogen.

Many vaccines require multiple doses for maximum effectiveness, either to produce sufficient initial immune response or to boost response that fades over time. For example, tetanus vaccine boosters are often recommended every 10 years. Vaccine schedules are developed by governmental agencies or physicians groups to achieve maximum effectiveness using required and recommended vaccines for a locality while minimizing the number of health care system interactions. Over the past two decades, the recommended vaccination schedule has grown rapidly and become more complicated as many new vaccines have been developed.

Some vaccines are recommended only in certain areas (countries, sub national areas, or at-risk populations) where a disease is common. For instance, yellow fever vaccination is on the routine vaccine schedule of French Guiana, is recommended in certain regions of Brazil but in the United States is only given to travelers heading to countries with a history of the disease. In developing countries, vaccine recommendations also take into account the level of health care access, the cost of vaccines and issues with vaccine availability and storage. Sample vaccination schedules discussed by the World Health Organization show a developed country using a schedule which extends over the first five years of a child's life and uses vaccines which cost over $700 including administration costs while a developing country uses a schedule providing vaccines in the first 9 months of life and costing only $25. This difference is due to the lower cost of health care, the lower cost of many vaccines provided to developing nations, and that more expensive vaccines, often for less common diseases, are not utilized.

Worldwide
The World Health Organization monitors vaccination schedules across the world, noting what vaccines are included in each country's program, the coverage rates achieved and various auditing measures. The table below shows the types of vaccines given in example countries. The WHO publishes on its website current vaccination schedules for all WHO member states. Additional vaccines are given to individuals more likely to come into contact with specific diseases through work or travel (e.g. military), or after potentially infectious exposure. Examples include rabies, anthrax, cholera and smallpox.

By country

Australia
The Immunise Australia Program implements the National Immunization Program (NIP) Schedule. All vaccines available under the Australian immunization schedule are free of charge under the Pharmaceutical Benefits Scheme.

Austria
Austrian vaccine recommendations are developed by the National Vaccination Board, which is part of the Federal Ministry of Social Affairs, Health, Care and Consumer Protection.

Children aged 14 and older can be vaccinated without parental consent.

Brazil
All recommended vaccines are provide free of charge by the public health services

Canada
In Canada, publicly funded immunization schedules may vary from province or territory.

Alberta

British Columbia

New Brunswick

Ontario

Quebec

Finland

History
1960: Mumps vaccinations for military recruits.
1975: Measles vaccination for 1 year old children.
1975: Rubella vaccination for 11–13 years old girls and seronegative mothers.
1982: Two doses of MMR vaccination at 14–18 months and 6 years of age were introduced in the national childhood vaccination programme.
2009: Rotavirus vaccine introduced at 2, 3 and 5 months to all children (September 2009)
2010: PCV introduced at 3, 5 and 12 months of age to all children (September 2010).
2013: HPV vaccination of girls introduced
2017: Varicella vaccination introduced (1 September 2017) at 18 months, 6 years + catch-up of all born from 1 January 2006 or after with no history of varicella.
2020: HPV vaccination of boys introduced

France

Germany
In Germany, a vaccination schedule is developed by the Standing Committee on Vaccination (STIKO), which operates as part of the Robert Koch Institute. The recommendations are generally adopted by the Federal Joint Committee.

Hong Kong 

In Hong Kong, Department of Health is responsible for providing free vaccinations from newborns up to primary school students.

India 
In India, the standard vaccination schedule is recommended by the Indian Academy of Paediatrics(IAP). The latest schedule was the one given in 2016.

Italy

Japan 
By the combined laws, infections are categorized into two groups: Category A is recommended for vaccination to prevent pandemic whereas Category B is only for a personal care purpose. As of January 2020, fourteen infections are Category A diseases and two are Category B on the legal lists. The Act and the Order were enacted for mandatory vaccination in 1948 with punitive clauses, only the clauses were repealed in 1976 and eventually vaccination has become non-mandatory since 1994.

Only in the legal term in Japan, citizens get old one day before their birthdays. If a person was born on January 1, 2020, and Immunization Act specifies vaccine against measles could be received from age 12 months to 24 months, vaccination shall be practiced between December 31, 2020, and December 31, 2021 (not between January 2021 and January 2022.) Some vaccinations are scheduled in line with the school year system, which starts from April 1 in Japan. As explained, those who born on April 1 and on April 2 get old legally on March 31 and April 1, respectively. Thus, these two people are in different school years and thereby they may take vaccines in different calendar years.

New Zealand

History
Major additions, replacements and removals from the New Zealand Immunization Schedule include:
1958: First Schedule: DTwP and DT
1961: Polio (OPV) added
1971: Measles, rubella and tetanus toxoid added
1979: Rubella changed to girls only
1988: HepB added
1990: MMR replaced measles and rubella
1994: HIB added; Td replaced tetanus toxoid
1996: DT dropped
1997: Influenza added
2000: DTaP replaced DTwP
2002: IPV replaced OPV
2006: MeNZB and Tdap added
2008: MeNZB dropped, PCV7 added, HPV4 added for females only
2011: PCV10 replaced PCV7
2014: RV5 added, PCV13 replaced PCV10
2017: HPV9 replaced HPV4 and extended to males, RV1 replaced RV5, PCV10 replaced PCV13, VV added.
2018: HZ added.
2020: Td dropped.

Nigeria
All recommended vaccines are provide free of charge by the Federal Ministry of Health.

Spain

United Kingdom
The United Kingdom childhood vaccination schedule is recommended by the Department of Health and National Health Service, and uses combination immunisations where available.

Non-routine vaccinations
Some children may receive vaccines in addition to those listed in the table:
 BCG vaccine is given at birth to "children born in areas of the country where there are high numbers of TB cases" and "children whose parents or grandparents were born in a country with many cases of TB."
 Hepatitis B vaccine is given at birth to "babies born to mothers who have hepatitis B".
 The injected flu vaccine is offered annually to "children 6 months to 17 years old with long-term health conditions".

Adult vaccinations
The five scheduled childhood tetanus vaccinations are thought to generally confer lifelong immunity; thus, no routine booster doses are given in adulthood. Those adults at risk of contaminated cuts (e.g., gardeners) may have booster tetanus vaccination every ten years. Pneumococcus vaccinations (pneumococcal polysaccharide vaccine/PPV) are recommended for those over 65 and for people without a functional spleen (asplenia), either because the spleen has been removed or does not work properly. Flu vaccine is recommended for anyone who is aged 65 years and over, people with certain long-term medical conditions, health and social care professionals, pregnant women, and poultry workers. The shingles vaccine is recommended for those over 70. Additionally, pregnant women are advised to have the pertussis vaccine.

United States
The most up-to-date schedules are available from CDC's National Center for Immunization and Respiratory Diseases. In the US, the National Childhood Vaccine Injury Act requires all health-care providers to provide parents or patients with copies of Vaccine Information Statements before administering vaccines.

During pregnancy 
The CDC recommends pregnant women receive some vaccines, such as the measles, mumps, rubella (MMR) vaccine a month or more before pregnancy. The Tdap vaccine (to help protect against whooping cough) is recommended during pregnancy. Other vaccines, like the flu shot, can be given before or during pregnancy, depending on whether or not it is flu season. Vaccination is safe right after giving birth, even while breastfeeding.

History 
In 1900, the smallpox vaccine was the only one administered to children. By the early 1950s, children routinely received three vaccines, for protection against diphtheria, pertussis, tetanus, and smallpox, and as many as five shots by two years of age. Since the mid-1980s, many vaccines have been added to the schedule. In 2009, the U.S. Centers for Disease Control and Prevention (CDC) recommended vaccination against at least fourteen diseases. By two years of age, U.S. children receive as many as 24 vaccine injections, and might receive up to five shots during one visit to the doctor. The use of combination vaccine products means that, the United Kingdom's immunization program consists of nine injections by the age of two, rather than 22 if vaccination for each disease was given as a separate injection.

See also
 Vaccination policy
 Influenza vaccine
 H5N1 clinical trials
 2009 flu pandemic vaccine
 COVID-19 vaccine

References

External links
 International
 
 UN World Health Organization: 
 Europe
 Vaccine schedules in all countries of the European Union, European Centre for Disease Prevention and Control
 United Kingdom
 
 USA
 
 CDC 2013 Recommended Immunizations for Children from Birth Through 6 Years Old

Schedule, Vaccination

it:Vaccinazione#Calendario vaccinale
vi:Lịch tiêm chủng